Place Sainte-Foy is an upscale shopping mall located in the former city of Sainte-Foy of Quebec City, Quebec, Canada. It is owned by Ivanhoé Cambridge.

The anchors are Simons, Signature Maurice Tanguay, Metro, Saks Off 5th and Archambault. The mall has 135 stores covering 590,000 square feet (54,800 square metres) including the first Apple Store in the Capitale-Nationale. The mall is situated next to Université Laval and to the shopping malls Laurier Québec and Place de la Cité.

Place Sainte-Foy, one of Ivanhoé Cambridge's oldest shopping centres, opened in phases in late 1958 and early 1959 and was developed by Ivanhoe Corporation on a site formerly anchored by just a Steinberg supermarket since November 1957. The Royal Bank of Canada is the oldest tenant of Place Sainte-Foy, while the Salon Maxime hairdresser shop has been in the mall for over 50 years. Initially an outdoor shopping centre, Place Sainte-Foy expanded in late 1961 to become a mall with 56 new stores including Simons and Wise.  Among the current anchor tenants, Simons is by far the oldest; inaugurated in 1961 it expanded in 1988 and 2010. Past anchors include Steinberg (1958–92), Miracle Mart/M (1963–92), Eaton (1975–99), Holt Renfrew (1965-2015) and Les Ailes de la Mode (1997-2015).

The sale of Mail Champlain to Cominar Real Estate Investment Trust in 2014 left Place Sainte-Foy as the last remaining shopping mall originally built by the former Ivanhoe Corporation that is still managed by Ivanhoé Cambridge. From 2004 to 2012, Place Sainte-Foy was owned in equal proportions by Ivanhoé Cambridge and Commerzbank AG (Commerz Real) of Germany. Ivanhoé Cambridge reacquired Commerbanz's stake in Place Sainte-Foy in 2012 to become wholly owner of the mall again.

In October 2010, Place Sainte-Foy completed a two-year renovations which added an underground parking to the mall and increased the size of the Simons store.

The most recent investment project was announced in 2016, when the mall owners announced a $60 million project to build a state-of-the-art parking facility in the rear of the mall, adjoining Hochelaga Boulevard. The structure will include four stories above ground and one other underground level, totaling 3000 parking spaces.

See also
 Laurier Québec
 Galeries de la Capitale
 Fleur de Lys centre commercial
 List of largest enclosed shopping malls in Canada

References

External links

Shopping malls established in 1958
1958 establishments in Quebec
Shopping malls in Quebec City
Ivanhoé Cambridge